Sciota may refer to:

Places
 Sciota, Illinois
 Sciota, Pennsylvania
 Sciota Township, McDonough County, Illinois
 Sciota Township, Shiawassee County, Michigan
 Sciota Township, Dakota County, Minnesota

Moths
  Sciota (moth), moths belonging to family Pyralidae including
 Sciota adelphella
 Sciota rhenella
 Sciota subcaesiella

Ships
USS Sciota (1861)
USS Sciota (AT-30)
USS Sciota (ATA-205)

See also
Scioto (disambiguation)